Cameron Mackray Champ (born June 15, 1995) is an American professional golfer from Sacramento, California.

College career 
For the Texas A&M Aggies he won the OFCC/Fighting Illini Invitational and finished in the top 10 of six other tournaments. He finished second to Adam Wise in the Pac-12 Robert Brandi Invitational.

2017 U.S. Open 
Champ qualified for the 2017 U.S. Open through sectional qualifying, where he had to compete in a playoff.  It was his first major appearance. After two rounds, he was tied for eighth place, and was also leading the driving distance statistics. Along with Scottie Scheffler, he was one of only two amateurs to make the cut. Scheffler finished as the low amateur at 1-under-par, while Champ finished at even-par.

Professional career
In December 2017, Champ tied for 16th in the Web.com Tour Qualifying Tournament. This earned him a place on the Web.com Tour for the start of 2018.

During the 2018 Web.com Tour season, Champ won the 2018 Utah Championship in July 2018. He earned his tour card for the 2018–19 PGA Tour season by earning $253,731 and finishing 6th in the 2018 Web.com Tour regular season.

On October 28, 2018, Champ won his first PGA Tour title by winning the Sanderson Farms Championship with a score of −21. Over and above his win, Champ had an excellent 2018 Fall Series, finishing T25 at the Safeway Open, T28 at the Shriners Hospitals for Children Open, T10 at the Mayakoba Golf Classic and 6th at the RSM Classic. This brought his world ranking up to 97 as of November 19, 2018 and left him 6th on the FedEx Cup standings heading into the 2019 calendar year.

Champ is known for being one of the longest hitters on the PGA Tour. In 2017, Champ registered a 129.79 mph average clubhead speed in his debut at the OHL Classic at Mayakoba.

Champ has worked with instructor Sean Foley since age 14 and although he hits a lower ball flight than the average long hitter on the PGA Tour, Champ was the longest driver on tour for the 2018–19 season with a 317.1 yard average. For the 2018 Web.com tour season, Champ averaged 343.1 yards off the tee and led the 2017 U.S. Open in driving distance at 337 yards.

On September 29, 2019, Champ won the Safeway Open with a birdie at the 72nd hole. It was his first win in a full−strength PGA Tour tournament.

On June 23, 2020, prior to the Travelers Championship, Champ became the second PGA Tour player to test positive for COVID-19 after Nick Watney did the week before.

On July 25, 2021, Champ scored a two stroke victory at the 3M Open after hitting a gap wedge on the 72nd hole from 127 yards to within 3 feet to save par. He had five birdies and no bogeys in his final round to shoot 15-under 269 at TPC Twin Cities. Louis Oosthuizen, Jhonattan Vegas and Charl Schwartzel tied for second.

Personal life
Champ is of mixed black and white descent. His father is biracial (black and white), while Cameron's mother is white. Cameron's father Jeff played two seasons of professional baseball in the Baltimore Orioles organization. Champ supports Black Lives Matter.

Professional wins (4)

PGA Tour wins (3)

Web.com Tour wins (1)

Results in major championships
Results not in chronological order in 2020.

CUT = missed the half-way cut
"T" = tied
NT = No tournament due to COVID-19 pandemic

Summary

Most consecutive cuts made – 3 (2017 U.S. Open – 2020 PGA)
Longest streak of top-10s – 1 (twice)

Results in The Players Championship

CUT = missed the halfway cut

WD = withdrew
C = Canceled after the first round due to the COVID-19 pandemic

Results in World Golf Championships

1Cancelled due to COVID-19 pandemic

NT = No tournament
"T" = Tied

U.S. national team appearances
Amateur
Junior Ryder Cup: 2012 (winners)
Walker Cup: 2017 (winners)

See also
2018 Web.com Tour Finals graduates

References

External links

American male golfers
Texas A&M Aggies men's golfers
PGA Tour golfers
African-American golfers
Korn Ferry Tour graduates
Golfers from Sacramento, California
Golfers from Houston
1995 births
Living people
21st-century African-American sportspeople